Tan Yan Wei (28 January 1975 – 27 April 2011), or simply known as Yuan, was a Malaysian composer. He is known for his film scores for the films Puteri Gunung Ledang (2004), 2005 Burmese film Kyan Sit Min, Malaysian 3D English animation film SeeFood and the Malaysian action drama film Bunohan.

Filmography

Awards and nominations

Awards

Death 
Yan Wei died at the Pantai Hospital, Kuala Lumpur on  27 April 2011 from complications due to hyper thyroid at the age of 36.

References

1970 births
2011 deaths
Malaysian musicians
Malaysian composers
Malaysian film score composers